Abdulle Geedanaar is a Somali poet from the Abgaal clan. He is famous for his Guuroow (poetry).

References

Somalian poets
Year of birth missing (living people)
Living people
Place of birth missing (living people)